Luigi Vespoli (12 January 1834 – 1861) was an Italian composer. His opera La cantante premiered at the Teatro di San Carlo in Naples on 22 October 1858.

References

1834 births
1861 deaths
Italian classical composers
Italian male classical composers
Italian opera composers
Male opera composers
19th-century classical composers
19th-century Italian composers
19th-century Italian male musicians